Soraia Chaves (born 22 June 1982 in Lisbon) is a Portuguese actress and model. She became famous with the role of Amélia in the film O Crime do Padre Amaro and the role of Maria in her next film, Call Girl. She also played the role of Raquel in Dancing Days, a 2012-13 soap opera broadcast on the Portuguese television network SIC. She also starred in the film Real Playing Game.

References

External links

1982 births
Living people
Portuguese film actresses
Portuguese female models
Actresses from Lisbon
Golden Globes (Portugal) winners